Mabel's Strange Predicament is a 1914 American film starring Mabel Normand and Charles Chaplin, notable for being the first film for which Chaplin donned the costume of The Tramp, although his appearance in the costume in Kid Auto Races at Venice was released first. The film was directed by Normand and produced by Mack Sennett.

Plot
An inebriated Charlie annoys several hotel guest while sitting in the lobby.  In her hotel room, Mabel is playfully tossing a ball to her dog.  The noise disturbs Alice who occupies the room across the hall from Mabel.  She informs Chester that she is going to the lobby to make a complaint to the manager.  Not long after Alice leaves her room, Mabel accidentally locks herself out of her room while wearing only pajamas.  Charlie happens by and tries to woo her.  Mabel flees in embarrassment and eventually enters Alice and Chester's room to hide.  Mabel crawls under the bed.  Mabel's beau, Harry, brings a bouquet of flowers to Mabel and has a bellhop unlock her room.  Finding Mabel absent, Harry decides to wait for her in the room occupied by his friends—Chester and Alice!  When Harry finds Mable hiding under Chester's bed, he assumes the worst and starts a fight with Chester.  Alice returns and, upon seeing Mabel, also assumes the worst and starts a fight with her husband.  By the movie's end, Harry and Mabel have reconciled, but Alice and Chester have escalated their fight.

Cast
Mabel Normand as Mabel
Charles Chaplin as The Tramp
Chester Conklin as Husband
Alice Davenport as Wife
Harry McCoy as Lover
Hank Mann as Hotel Guest
Al St. John as Bellboy

Review
A reviewer for Exhibitors' Mail saw the genius of Charles Chaplin in what was only his third film, and predicted great things for the former English stage comedian, writing: "The Keystone Company never made a better contract than when they signed on Chas. Chaplin, the Karno performer. It is not every variety artiste who possesses the ability to act before the camera. Chaplin not only shows that talent, he shows it in a degree which raises him at once to the status of star performer. We do not often indulge in prophecy, but we do not think we are taking a great risk in prophesying that in six months Chaplin will rank as one of the most popular screen performers in the world. Certainly there has never been before quite so successful a first appearance."

First "Tramp" appearance filmed
The Tramp was first presented to the public in Chaplin's second film Kid Auto Races at Venice (released February 7, 1914), though Mabel's Strange Predicament, his third film in order of release (released February 9, 1914), was produced a few days earlier. It was for this film that Chaplin first conceived of and played The Tramp. As he recalled in his autobiography:

Mabel's Strange Predicament is one of more than a dozen early films that writer/director/comedian Mabel Normand made with Chaplin. Normand, who had written and directed films before Chaplin, mentored the young comedian. Chaplin's Tramp is shown swigging from a flask toward the beginning of the film and subsequently becoming so drunk that he staggers when he walks and falls down repeatedly near the end. His portrayal of drunkenness remains convincingly realistic. The Tramp also keeps his derby cocked throughout the action, a touch that Chaplin abandoned later in his career.

See also
 Charlie Chaplin filmography
 List of American films of 1914

References

External links
 
 
 

1914 films
1914 comedy films
American silent short films
Silent American comedy films
American black-and-white films
Films produced by Mack Sennett
Articles containing video clips
Films directed by Mabel Normand
1910s American films